is a Japanese former Nippon Professional Baseball pitcher.

References 

1970 births
Living people
Baseball people from Chiba Prefecture 
Japanese baseball players
Nippon Professional Baseball pitchers
Nippon Ham Fighters players
Yokohama Taiyō Whales players
Yokohama BayStars players
Yakult Swallows players
Osaka Kintetsu Buffaloes players
Managers of baseball teams in Japan